A gas meter is a specialized flow meter, used to measure the volume of fuel gases such as natural gas and liquefied petroleum gas. Gas meters are used at residential, commercial, and industrial buildings that consume fuel gas supplied by a gas utility. Gases are more difficult to measure than liquids, because measured volumes are highly affected by temperature and pressure. Gas meters measure a defined volume, regardless of the pressurized quantity or quality of the gas flowing through the meter. Temperature, pressure, and heating value compensation must be made to measure actual amount and value of gas moving through a meter.

Several different designs of gas meters are in common use, depending on the volumetric flow rate of gas to be measured, the range of flows anticipated, the type of gas being measured, and other factors.

Gas meters that exist in colder climates in buildings built prior to the 1970s were typically located inside the home, typically in the basement or garage. Since then, the vast majority are now placed outside though there are a few exceptions especially in older cities.

Types of gas meters

Diaphragm/bellows meters

These are the most common type of gas meter, seen in almost all residential and small commercial installations. Within the meter there are two or more chambers formed by movable diaphragms. With the gas flow directed by internal valves, the chambers alternately fill and expel gas, producing a nearly continuous flow through the meter. As the diaphragms expand and contract, levers connected to cranks convert the linear motion of the diaphragms into rotary motion of a crank shaft which serves as the primary flow element. This shaft can drive an odometer-like counter mechanism or it can produce electrical pulses for a flow computer.

Diaphragm gas meters are positive displacement meters.

Rotary meters

Rotary meters are highly machined precision instruments capable of handling higher volumes and pressures than diaphragm meters. Within the meter, two figure "8" shaped lobes, the rotors (also known as impellers or pistons), spin in precise alignment. With each turn, they move a specific quantity of gas through the meter. The operating principle is similar to that of a Roots blower. The rotational movement of the crank shaft serves as a primary flow element and may produce electrical pulses for a flow computer or may drive an odometer-like counter.

Turbine meters
Turbine gas meters infer gas volume by determining the speed of the gas moving through the meter. Because the volume of gas is inferred from the flow, it is important that flow conditions are good. A small internal turbine measures the speed of the gas, which is transmitted mechanically to a mechanical or electronic counter. These meters do not impede the flow of gas, but are limited at measuring lower flow rates.

Orifice meters
An orifice gas meter consists of a straight length of pipe inside which a precisely known orifice plate creates a pressure drop, thereby affecting flow. Orifice meters are a type of differential meter, all of which infer the rate of gas flow by measuring the pressure difference across a deliberately designed and installed flow disturbance. The gas static pressure, density, viscosity, and temperature must be measured or known in addition to the differential pressure for the meter to accurately measure the fluid. Orifice meters often do not handle a large range of flow rates. They are however accepted and understood in industrial applications since they are easy to field-service and have no moving parts.

Ultrasonic flow meters
Ultrasonic flow meters are more complex than meters that are purely mechanical, as they require significant signal processing and computation capabilities. Ultrasonic meters measure the speed of gas movement by measuring the speed at which sound travels in the gaseous medium within the pipe. American Gas Association covers the proper usage and installation of these meters, and it specifies a standardised speed-of-sound calculation which predicts the speed of sound in a gas with a known pressure, temperature, and composition.

The most elaborate types of ultrasonic flow meters average speed of sound over multiple paths in the pipe. The length of each path is precisely measured in the factory. Each path consists of an ultrasonic transducer at one end and a sensor at the other. The meter creates a 'ping' with the transducer and measures the time elapsed before the sensor receives the sonic pulse. Some of these paths point upstream so that the sum of the times of flight of the sonic pulses can be divided by the sum of the flight lengths to provide an average speed of sound in the upstream direction. This speed differs from the speed of sound in the gas by the velocity at which the gas is moving in the pipe. The other paths may be identical or similar, except that the sound pulses travel downstream. The meter then compares the difference between the upstream and downstream speeds to calculate the velocity of gas flow.

Ultrasonic meters are high-cost and work best with no liquids present at all in the measured gas, so they are primarily used in high-flow, high-pressure applications such as utility pipeline meter stations, where the gas is always dry and lean, and where small proportional inaccuracies are intolerable due to the large amount of money at stake. The turndown ratio of an ultrasonic meter is probably the largest of any natural gas meter type, and the accuracy and range ability of a high-quality ultrasonic meter is actually greater than that of the turbine meters against which they are proven.

Inexpensive varieties of ultrasonic meters are available as clamp-on flow meters, which can be used to measure flow in any diameter of pipe without intrusive modification. Such devices are based on two types of technology: (1) time of flight or transit time; and (2) cross correlation. Both technologies involve transducers that are simply clamped on to the pipe and programmed with the pipe size and schedule and can be used to calculate flow. Such meters can be used to measure almost any dry gas including natural gas, nitrogen, compressed air, and steam. Clamp-on meters are available for measuring liquid flow as well.

Coriolis meters

A coriolis meter is usually one or more pipes with longitudinally or axially displaced section(s) that are excited to vibrate at resonant frequency. Coriolis meters are used with liquids and gases. When the fluid within the displaced section is at rest, both the upstream and downstream portion of the displaced section will vibrate in phase with each other. The frequency of this vibration is determined by the overall density of the pipe (including its contents). This allows the meter to measure the flowing density of the gas in real time. Once the fluid begins to flow, however, the Coriolis force comes into play. This effect implies a relationship between the phase difference in the vibration of the upstream and downstream sections and the mass flow rate of the fluid contained by the pipe.

Again, owing to the amount of inference, analog control and calculation intrinsic to a coriolis meter, the meter is not complete with just its physical components. There are actuation, sensing, electronic, and computational elements that must be present for the meter to function.

Coriolis meters can handle a wide range of flow rates and have the unique ability to output mass flow - this gives the highest accuracy of flow measurement currently available for mass flow measurement. Since they measure flowing density, coriolis meters can also infer gas flow rate at flowing conditions.

American Gas Association Report No. 11 provides guidelines for obtaining good results when measuring natural gas with a coriolis meter.

Heating value
The volume of gas flow provided by a gas meter is just that, a reading of volume. Gas volume does not take into account the quality of the gas or the amount of heat available when burned. Utility customers are billed according to the heat available in the gas. The quality of the gas is measured and adjusted for in each billing cycle. This is known by several names as the calorific value, heating value, or therm value.

The calorific value of natural gas can be obtained using a process gas chromatograph, which measures the amount of each constituent of the gas, namely:
methane
ethane
hydrogen
carbon monoxide
water vapour

Additionally, to convert from volume to thermal energy, the pressure and temperature of the gas must be taken into consideration. Pressure is generally not a problem; the meter is simply installed immediately downstream of a pressure regulator and is calibrated to read accurately at that pressure. Pressure compensation then occurs in the utility's billing system. Varying temperature cannot be handled as easily, but some meters are designed with built-in temperature compensation to keep them reasonably accurate over their designed temperature range. Others are corrected for temperature electronically.

Indicating devices

Any type of gas meter can be obtained with a wide variety of indicators. The most common are indicators that use multiple clock hands (pointer style) or digital readouts similar to an odometer, but remote readouts of various types are also becoming popular — see Automatic meter reading and Smart meter.

Accuracy

Gas meters are required to register the volume of gas consumed within an acceptable degree of accuracy. Any significant error in the registered volume can represent a loss to the gas supplier, or the consumer being overbilled. The accuracy is generally laid down in statute for the location in which the meter is installed. Statutory provisions should also specify a procedure to be followed should the accuracy be disputed.
 
In the UK, the permitted error for a gas meter manufactured prior to the European Measuring Instruments Directive is ±2%. However, the European Measuring Instrument Directive has harmonised gas meter errors across Europe and consequently meters manufactured since the directive came into force must read within ±3%. Meters whose accuracy is disputed by the customer have to be removed for testing by an approved meter examiner. If the meter is found to be reading outside of the prescribed limits, the supplier has to refund the consumer for gas incorrectly measured while that consumer had that meter (but not vice versa). Any refund is limited to the previous six years. If the meter cannot be tested or its reading is unreliable, the consumer and supplier have to negotiate a settlement. If the meter is found to be reading within limits, the consumer has to pay the costs of testing (and pay any outstanding charges). This contrasts with the position on electric meters, where the test is free and a refund is only given if the date that the meter started to read inaccurately can be determined.

Remote readouts

Remote reading is becoming popular for gas meters. It is often done through an electronic pulse output mounted on the meter. There are different styles available but most common is a contact closure switch.

Flow measurement calculations

Turbine, rotary, and diaphragm meters can be compensated using a calculation specified in American Gas Association Report No. 7. This standardised calculation compensates the quantity of volume as measured to quantity of volume at a set of base conditions. The AGA 7 calculation itself is a simple ratio and is, in essence, a density correction approach to translating the volume or rate of gas at flowing conditions to a volume or rate at base conditions.

Orifice meters are a very commonly used type of meter, and because of their widespread use, the characteristics of gas flow through an orifice meter have been closely studied. American Gas Association Report No. 3 deals with a broad range of issues relating to orifice metering of natural gas, and it specifies an algorithm for calculating natural gas flow rates based on the differential pressure, static pressure, and temperature of a gas with a known composition.

These calculations depend in part on the ideal gas law and also require a gas compressibility calculation in order to account for the fact that real gases are not ideal. A very commonly used compressibility calculation is American Gas Association Report No. 8, detail characterization.

Thread sizing standards

Residential, commercial and industrial gas meters have their own standard thread sizes. The gas meter is connected to customer piping through a swivel and nut, which has a dedicated set of thread sizes. These thread sizes were originally named for the amount of gas designed to flow through them in terms of gas lamps, for example a 30-Lt. meter can provide enough gas for 30 lights and was referred to in the late 19th century as a 30-light-gas-meter. These sizes are typically 10Lt, 20Lt, 30Lt, 45Lt, or 60Lt, though smaller and larger sizes are available.

See also
Automatic Meter Reading
Flow conditioning#Effects on flow measurement devices
Electricity meter
Flow measurement
Gas flow computer
Gas meter prover
Meter-Bus
Julius Pintsch
Smart meter
Thermal mass flow meter
Turnaround document (way of collecting data from)
Utility submeter
Water meter

References

Flow meters
Gas technologies
Natural gas safety
Public services